Jan Russ (born 1939) is an Australian casting director, producer and actor of theatre and TV.

Russ in best known for best known for her work as a casting director on the TV soap opera Neighbours from the show's beginning in 1985 to her departure in 2009. Russ was also the casting director on Prisoner until the show's cancellation. In 2009, Russ made a guest appearance in City Homicide, the first time she had acted since 1982.

Biography
Russ was born in Maribyrnong, a suburb northwest of Melbourne and was a member of the Maribyrnong Youth Club when she was younger. In 1956, Russ, along with her drama group, won the Victorian Association of Youth Club's drama championship. Russ played Alice in an adaptation of Lewis Carroll's Through the Looking-Glass.

She later worked in professional theatre shows such as Oliver!, Fiddler on the Roof and Godspell. Russ lived in New Zealand while she worked in musical theatre and appeared on television shows. She later decided to move behind the camera and worked as a Production Assistant and Floor Manager, which made her the first female in the industry to do so.

During the 1960s, Russ gave birth to a daughter. She was forced to give the child up for adoption as she was young and unwed. Russ's story was later turned into a play, The Show Must Go On, which was written by Robyn Bishop and directed by Mike Bishop. Russ has a son, Samuel Hammington, who is an actor and comedian.

In September 2014 Russ was featured in The Past Is A Foreign Country, a two part episode of the ABC documentary series Australian Story.

Casting career
When Russ moved back to Australia, she began working as the casting assistant for Crawford Productions. In the early 1980s, Ian Smith called Russ and asked if she would like to meet with the Producer at Grundy Television, Russ met the producer and was offered the job of casting director on the television show Prisoner. Russ worked on the show for eighteen months until its cancellation.

Russ began working as the casting director on Neighbours in 1985 and she cast the regular and guest cast roles throughout her time with the show. She is credited with discovering many of the show's stars who have gone on to forge international careers, including Craig McLachlan, Delta Goodrem, Natalie Imbruglia, Guy Pearce and Jesse Spencer., Holly Valance Madeleine West and Brooke Satchwell.

In 1986, she cast Kylie Minogue and Jason Donovan in their famous roles of Charlene Mitchell and Scott Robinson. Russ' casting talent has led her to be called "Australia's most enduring star-maker" and she later became the show's associate producer.

In 2006, Russ was responsible for choosing the winners of Dolly magazine's search for Neighbours' next big stars competition. She had to go through seven thousand taped entries over several weeks, before starting live auditions. Adelaide Kane (Lolly Allen) and Sam Clark (Ringo Brown) were eventually chosen and given a three-month contract with the show. The Dolly competition ran again in 2008 and Russ handpicked Mauricio Merino Jr. and Chelsea Jones to star as Simon and Tegan Freeman, respectively.

In March 2009, Russ' future with Neighbours was called into question following a backstage "shakeup". It was announced that FremantleMedia, the series production company, were planning to bring in an external casting agency. Fremantle's spokesman said "The casting role is critical to the show, it is an enormous job and it continues to grow by the day. We continue to discuss with Jan her role with the show, as her skill and talents are incredible". Two months later, it was announced that Russ was in discussions about her future with the show and about her involvement in the Dolly magazine competition and the 25th Anniversary. Russ worked as casting director for Grundy Television, and its successor FremantleMedia for a total of twenty-five years.

In 2010, it was revealed that Russ would be casting a new television project, created and developed by the McMahon Entertainment Group.

Acting
Russ has had acting roles in Division 4, Homicide and The Clinic. Russ had a guest role as Mrs Daniels on Prisoner before she became the casting director.

Russ appeared at the Melbourne International Comedy Festival in 2009 and in September of that year, she made a guest appearance in City Homicide alongside Daniel MacPherson, whom she cast in Neighbours in 1998. Russ had not performed on television since Prisoner in 1982. Her character was Robyn Turner, a community volunteer. Russ said she received an email from the City Homicide casting team, which said there was a role they wanted to see her for and would she be interested in auditioning. Russ call her audition "bizarre" and "strange".

References

External links
 

Living people
Australian television producers
Australian women television producers
Australian casting directors
Women casting directors
1939 births
People from the City of Maribyrnong